George England (fl. 1740–1788), was an English organ-builder.

Family

He married the daughter of Richard Bridge (another organ-builder) and was the father of George Pike England (1765?–1814), who also became an organ-builder.

Works

England built the organs of:
Christ's Chapel of God's Gift, Dulwich, London, 1759
St Stephen Walbrook, City of London, 1760
St Matthew Friday Street, City of London, 1762
St George's Church, Gravesend, Kent, 1764
St Michael and All Angels' Church, Ashton-under-Lyne, Lancashire, 1770
St Michael Queenhithe, City of London, 1779 (in conjunction with Hugh Russell) 
St Mary Aldermary, City of London, 1781 (in conjunction with Hugh Russell)
St Mildred, Poultry, City of London (demolished)
German Lutheran Church, Goodman's Fields, Tower Hamlets, London
St Alfege Church, Greenwich, London 

‘These organs were remarkable for the brightness and brilliancy of their chorus’ (Hopkins). That of St. Stephen's, Walbrook, a fine specimen of England's work, was repaired by Gray in 1825, rebuilt 1872, and considerably enlarged later by William Hill & Sons.

References

Year of birth missing
Year of death missing
18th-century English people
Organ builders of the United Kingdom